The 2021–22 WNBL season was the 42nd season of the competition since its establishment in 1981. The Southside Flyers were the defending champions, however they failed to qualify for finals. The Melbourne Boomers won their second championship, defeating Perth in the Grand Final series, 2–1.

After the 2020 season was condensed due to the COVID-19 pandemic, it was confirmed in July 2021 that the upcoming season is set to be closer to the traditional season fixture played over several months across the summer. In October 2021, a new broadcast deal was signed with the ABC, Fox Sports and Kayo, with an 84-game season fixture announced shortly after.

Spalding will again provide equipment including the official game ball, alongside iAthletic supplying team apparel for the fifth consecutive season.

Player movement

Standings

Finals

Statistics

Individual statistic leaders

Individual game highs

Awards

Player of the Week

Postseason Awards

Team captains and coaches

References

External links 
 WNBL official website
 WNBL Hub season fixtures

Basketball
2021 in women's basketball
Basketball
Australia